P'iq'iñ Q'ara (Aymara p'iq'iña head, q'ara bare, bald, p'iq'iña q'ara bald, "baldheaded", Hispanicized spelling Pekheñ Khara) is a  mountain in the Cordillera Occidental in the Andes of Bolivia. It is located in the Oruro Department, Sabaya Province, Sabaya Municipality. P'iq'iñ Q'ara is situated south-west of the mountain Kimsa Chata, near the border with Chile. It lies at the confluence of the rivers Chullumpiri Jawira and Lliscaya Jawira.

References 

Mountains of Oruro Department